Four Corners is the fifth studio album of the American jazz group Yellowjackets, released in 1987. The album reached a peak position of number three on Billboard Top Contemporary Jazz Albums chart. This was the first Yellowjackets album to feature Will Kennedy on drums.

Track listing

Personnel 

Yellowjackets
 Russell Ferrante – pianos, synthesizers 
 Jimmy Haslip – 5-string bass, fretless bass, vocals (2)
 Will Kennedy – drums, percussion
 Marc Russo – alto saxophone, soprano saxophone

Additional musicians
 Gary Barlough – Synclavier programming
 Alex Acuña – percussion, vocals (2)
 Bill Gable – cello (2), additional percussion (2), vocals (3)
 Brenda Russell – vocals (2)
 Diana Acuña – vocals (2)

Production 
 Yellowjackets – producers 
 David Hentschel – producer, recording, mixing 
 Ricky Schultz – executive producer 
 Dan Garcia – second engineer
 Andy Harper – second engineer
 Jon Ingoldsby – second engineer
 Sharon Rice – second engineer
 Bart Stevens – second engineer
 Stephen Marcussen – mastering 
 Kathleen Covert – art direction 
 John Coulter – design 
 Lou Beach – front and back cover illustrations 
 Bonnie Schiffman – photography 
 Gary Borman (Kragen & Company) – management

Studios
 Recorded at Schnee Studios, Music Grinder Studios and Producers Studio (Hollywood, CA).
 Mixed at The Complex (Los Angeles, CA).
 Mastered at Precision Lacquer (Los Angeles, CA).

Charts

References

Yellowjackets albums
1987 albums
Albums produced by David Hentschel
MCA Records albums
Instrumental albums